Pioneer Bridge Co. was an American bridge company located in Mitchell, South Dakota.

The company was founded by Arthur Bjodstrup in 1912. His father, Fred Bjodstrup, had previously built a number of bridges in South Dakota.

A number of its works are listed on the U.S. National Register of Historic Places. One bridge over Twelve Mile Creek near Mitchell was still standing as of 1993.

Works include:
Dell Rapids Bridge, local road over the Big Sioux River, Dell Rapids, South Dakota (Pioneer Bridge Company), NRHP-listed
South Dakota Dept. of Transportation Bridge No. 18-040-137, local road over Enemy Creek, Mitchell, South Dakota (Pioneer Bridge Company), NRHP-listed
South Dakota Dept. of Transportation Bridge No. 18-060-202, local road over Twelve Mile Creek, Mitchell, South Dakota (Pioneer Bridge Company), NRHP-listed
South Dakota Dept. of Transportation Bridge No. 18-100-052, local road over Firesteel Creek, Loomis, South Dakota (Pioneer Bridge Company), NRHP-listed

References

Bridge companies
Defunct companies based in South Dakota
Construction and civil engineering companies of the United States
Defunct construction and civil engineering companies
Construction and civil engineering companies established in 1912
1912 establishments in South Dakota
American companies established in 1912